Nicolae Tapu (1907 – 1974) was a Romanian racing cyclist. He rode in the 1936 Tour de France.

References

1907 births
1974 deaths
Romanian male cyclists
Place of birth missing